is a junction passenger railway station located in the city of  Nankoku, Kōchi Prefecture, Japan. The station is operated by JR Shikoku for its Dosan Line with the station number "D40" and by the third-sector Tosa Kuroshio Railway for its Asa Line with the station number "GN40".

Lines
Besides the local trains of the Dosan Line, the following JR limited express services also stop at Gomen Station:

In addition the station is the start point and western terminus of the Asa Line (also known as the Gomen-Nahari Line). However, all its rapid and some local trains continue westwards to end at  using the Dosan Line tracks.

Layout
The station consists of two island platforms serving four tracks. Track/platform 0 (a siding) and track/platform 1 (bidirectional) is used by Asa Line trains while tracks/platforms 2 and 3 (both bidirectional) are used by Dosan Line trains. A passing loop runs alongside track 3.

The present station building is an elevated structure where passenger facilities are located on a bridge which spans the tracks. The station entrance is on the south side of the tracks from where elevators and stairs lead to the bridge structure on level 2 which houses ticket gates, a waiting area and a JR ticket window (with a Midori no Madoguchi staffed ticket office) and a JR travel centre (Warp Plaza). From the bridge, separate stairs and elevators connect to all platforms. The bridge also connects to a second station entrance from road on the north side of the tracks.

Adjacent stations

History
The station opened on 5 December 1925 as an intermediate stop when the then Kōchi Line (now Dosan Line) was extended from Kōchi eastwards and then northwards towards . At that time the station was operated by Japanese Government Railways (JGR). On 1 April 1987, Japanese National Railways (JNR), the successor of JGR, was privatised and  control of the station passed to JR Shikoku.

Surrounding area
Kochi Prefectural Kochi East Technical High School
Kochi Prefectural Kochi Agricultural High School
Nankoku Municipal Gomenoda Elementary School
Nankoku City Nagaoka Elementary School

See also 
List of railway stations in Japan

References

External links

Gomen Station (JR Shikoku)
Gomen Station (Tosa Kuroshio Railway) 

Railway stations in Kōchi Prefecture
Railway stations in Japan opened in 1925
Nankoku, Kōchi